Iris prismatica, the slender blue flag or cubeseed iris, is a plant species native to parts of the southern and eastern United States from Maine south to Alabama, as well as to the Canadian provinces of Ontario and Nova Scotia.

Iris prismatica is a perennial herb spreading by means of rhizomes that are close to the surface of the soil. Flowering stalks can reach a height of 80 cm. Leaves are long and narrow, up to 60 cm long but rarely more than 5 mm across. It has 2–3 blooms in May. Flowers are pale blue to blue-violet. 
It tends to grow in swampy, wet conditions, and within the United States, it is currently state listed as 'threatened' in Maine, New Hampshire, New York, and Tennessee, and state listed as 'endangered' in Maryland and Pennsylvania. It is cold hardy to USDA Zone 3.

References

prismatica
Flora of the Northeastern United States
Flora of the Southeastern United States
Flora of Ontario
Flora of Nova Scotia
Flora of the Great Lakes region (North America)
Plants described in 1813
Taxa named by Frederick Traugott Pursh
Endangered flora of the United States
Flora without expected TNC conservation status